Gazella tingitana is an extinct species of gazelle from the Late Pleistocene of Morocco.

Arambourg described G. tingitana in 1957 from material at Mugharet el 'Aliya in Morocco, now dated to between 85 and 37 ka (85,000 - 37,000 BP). It was subsequently documented from Mid-to-Late Pleistocene (190,000 - 90 ka) deposits at Jebel Irhoud. Like most living gazelles, it may have been a mixed-feeder.

References

Prehistoric bovids
Pleistocene even-toed ungulates
Pleistocene mammals of Africa
Prehistoric mammals of Africa